Étrœungt is a commune in the Nord department in northern France.

Geography
The river Helpe Mineure (one of Sambre's affluents) runs through the village. The river is subject to occasional flooding.
Étrœungt is bordered by ten other communes, including two from Aisne department: Avesnelles, Boulogne-sur-Helpe, Féron, Floyon, Haut-Lieu, La Flamengrie (Aisne), Larouillies, Rainsars, Rocquigny (Aisne), Sémeries. The nearest train station is (SNCF) Avesnes-sur-Helpe.
It is 110 km from Lille (Préfecture du Nord), Brussels and Reims (Marne); 55 km from Valenciennes, Laon, Mons and Charleroi; 22 km from Maubeuge; 10 km from Fourmies and 7 km from Avesnes-sur-Helpe.
Highways leading to Étrœungt are the RN2 from Paris to Brussels. Belgium is just 15 km away.

Heraldry

Gallery

See also
Communes of the Nord department

References

Communes of Nord (French department)
Nord communes articles needing translation from French Wikipedia